Orton Mere is a station on the Nene Valley Railway and is situated between 
Ferry Meadows and Peterborough Nene Valley, adjacent to the River Nene.

Orton Mere provides access to the eastern end of the Nene Park. At Orton Mere, the Nene Valley Railway passes under the Orton Parkway, part of the complex road system built when Peterborough was allocated New Town status.

Orton Mere station appears in the James Bond film Octopussy and is easily identified by the flyover carrying the Nene Parkway.

External links

Nene Valley Railway
Heritage railway stations in Cambridgeshire
Transport in Peterborough
Buildings and structures in Peterborough
Railway stations built for UK heritage railways
Railway stations in Great Britain opened in 1983